Trio was an historic  trimaran sailboat derived from design by Lock Crowther and built by Howard Stephenson in 1962 using the hull of an Austral 20.

See also
List of multihulls
Kraken 25
Lock Crowther

References

Trimarans
1960s sailing yachts